The 1928 United States presidential election in Pennsylvania took place on November 6, 1928 as part of the 1928 United States presidential election. Voters chose 38 representatives, or electors to the Electoral College, who voted for president and vice president.

Pennsylvania overwhelmingly voted for the Republican nominee, U.S. Secretary of Commerce Herbert Hoover, over the Democratic nominee, New York Governor Al Smith. Hoover won Pennsylvania by a landslide margin of 31.35%. The Republicans at this time were associated with the booming economy of the 1920s while Smith was associated with the corruption of Tammany Hall.

Despite losing the state, Smith flipped 3 majority-Catholic counties that voted for Calvin Coolidge in 1924 and had been consistently Republican during the "System of 1896" into the Democratic column: Elk, Lackawanna, and Luzerne. This came with losing the 4 counties – all dominated by profoundly anti-Catholic Appalachian Protestants – that voted for John W. Davis to Hoover: Columbia, Fulton, Greene, and Monroe.

Results

Results by county

See also
 List of United States presidential elections in Pennsylvania

References

Pennsylvania
1928
1928 Pennsylvania elections